Silhouette refers to a method of interpretation and validation of consistency within clusters of data. The technique provides a succinct graphical representation of how well each object has been classified. It was proposed by Belgian statistician Peter Rousseeuw in 1987.

The silhouette value is a measure of how similar an object is to its own cluster (cohesion) compared to other clusters (separation). The silhouette ranges from −1 to +1, where a high value indicates that the object is well matched to its own cluster and poorly matched to neighboring clusters. If most objects have a high value, then the clustering configuration is appropriate. If many points have a low or negative value, then the clustering configuration may have too many or too few clusters.

The silhouette can be calculated with any distance metric, such as the Euclidean distance or the Manhattan distance.

Definition 

Assume the data have been clustered via any technique, such as k-medoids or k-means, into  clusters.

For data point  (data point  in the cluster ), let

 

We can interpret  as a measure of how well  is assigned to its cluster (the smaller the value, the better the assignment).

For each data point , we now define

The cluster with this smallest mean dissimilarity is said to be the "neighboring cluster" of  because it is the next best fit cluster for point .

We now define a silhouette (value) of one data point 

, if 

and

, if 

Which can be also written as:

From the above definition it is clear that

Note that  is not clearly defined for clusters with size = 1, in which case we set . This choice is arbitrary, but neutral in the sense that it is at the midpoint of the bounds, -1 and 1.

For  to be close to 1 we require . As  is a measure of how dissimilar  is to its own cluster, a small value means it is well matched. Furthermore, a large  implies that  is badly matched to its neighbouring cluster. Thus an  close to 1 means that the data is appropriately clustered. If  is close to -1, then by the same logic we see that  would be more appropriate if it was clustered in its neighbouring cluster. An  near zero means that the datum is on the border of two natural clusters.

The mean  over all points of a cluster is a measure of how tightly grouped all the points in the cluster are. Thus the mean  over all data of the entire dataset is a measure of how appropriately the data have been clustered. Thus silhouette plots and means may be used to determine the natural number of clusters within a dataset. One can also increase the likelihood of the silhouette being maximized at the correct number of clusters by re-scaling the data using feature weights that are cluster specific.

Kaufman et al. introduced the term silhouette coefficient for the maximum value of the mean  over all data of the entire dataset, i.e.,

where  represents the mean  over all data of the entire dataset for a specific number of clusters .

Simplified Silhouette and Medoid Silhouette 
Computing the silhouette coefficient needs all  pairwise distances, making this evaluation much more costly than clustering with k-means. For a clustering with centers  for each cluster , we can use the following simplified Silhouette for each point instead, which can be computed using only  distances:
which has the additional benefit that  is always defined, then define accordingly the simplified silhouette and simplified silhouette coefficient

.

If the cluster centers are medoids (as in k-medoids clustering) instead of arithmetic means (as in k-means clustering), this is also called the medoid-based silhouette or medoid silhouette.

If every object is assigned to the nearest medoid (as in k-medoids clustering), we know that , and hence .

Silhouette Clustering 

Instead of using the average silhouette to evaluate a clustering obtained from, e.g., k-medoids or k-means, we can try to directly find a solution that maximizes the Silhouette. We do not have a closed form solution to maximize this, but it will usually be best to assign points to the nearest cluster as done by these methods. Van der Laan et al. proposed to adapt the standard algorithm for k-medoids, PAM, for this purpose and call this algorithm PAMSIL:

 Choose initial medoids by using PAM
 Compute the average silhouette of this initial solution
 For each pair of a medoid  and a non-medoid 
 swap  and 
 compute the average silhouette of the resulting solution
 remember the best swap
 Perform the best swap and return to 3, otherwise stop if no improvement was found.

Because this is a fairly expensive operation, the authors propose to also use the medoid-based silhouette, and call the resulting algorithm PAMMEDSIL. It needs  time.

Batool et al. propose a similar algorithm under the name OSil, and propose a CLARA-like sampling strategy for larger data sets, that solves the problem only for a subsample.

By adopting recent improvements to the PAM algorithm, FastMSC reduces the runtime using the medoid silhouette to just .

See also 
 Davies–Bouldin index
 Determining the number of clusters in a data set

References 

Clustering criteria